PFC Berkut Armyansk ( Армянск) was a football team based in Armyansk, 
Crimea.

The club on the basis of which "Berkut" was created, was called "Agrocapital" (Suvorovskoye) and represented the Saky Raion at the republican level.

On April 30, 2016, the club's players boycotted the match against Bakhchisaray due to salary arrears, the match did not take place, and the club was awarded a forfeit defeat due to the non-appearance of the players. Most of the players arbitrarily left the club and were removed from the squad, and on May 12, 2016, the club withdrew from the Crimean Premier League and was disbanded.

Team names
 2015 – PFC Berkut Yevpatoria
 2016 – PFC Berkut Armyansk

League and cup history (Crimea)
{|class="wikitable"
|-bgcolor="#efefef"
! Season
! Div.
! Pos.
! Pl.
! W
! D
! L
! GS
! GA
! P
!Domestic Cup
!colspan=2|Europe
!Notes
|-
|align=center|2015
|align=center|1st All-Crimean Championship Gr. B
|align=center|5/10
|align=center|9
|align=center|5
|align=center|2
|align=center|2
|align=center|27
|align=center|27
|align=center|17
|align=center|
|align=center|
|align=center|
|align=center bgcolor=brick|Reorganization of competitions
|-
|align=center|2015–16
|align=center|1st Premier League
|align=center|8/8
|align=center|28
|align=center|1
|align=center|7
|align=center|20
|align=center|18
|align=center|61
|align=center|10
|align=center|Group stage
|align=center|
|align=center|
|align=center bgcolor=lightgrey|Withdrew
|-
|}

References

External links
Official website 

 
Defunct football clubs in Armyansk
Association football clubs established in 2015
Association football clubs disestablished in 2016
2015 establishments in Russia
2016 disestablishments in Russia